Friedrich Julius Richelot (6 November 1808 – 31 March 1875) was a German mathematician, born in Königsberg. He was a student of Carl Gustav Jacob Jacobi.

He was promoted in 1831 at the Philosophical Faculty of the University of Königsberg with a dissertation on the division of the circle into 257 equal parts (see references) and was a professor there.

Richelot authored numerous publications in German, French and Latin, among them — with his 1832 dissertation — the first known guide to the Euclidean construction of the regular 257-gon with compass and straightedge.

In 1825 he joined the Corps Masovia.

He died in Königsberg in 1875.

See also
Timeline of abelian varieties

References

Thesis
 Friedrich Julius Richelot: De resolutione algebraica aequationis x257 = 1, sive de divisione circuli per bisectionem anguli septies repetitam in partes 257 inter se aequales commentatio coronata. In: Journal für die reine und angewandte Mathematik. Nr. 9, 1832, S. 1–26, 146–161, 209–230, und 337–358.

19th-century German mathematicians
Academic staff of the University of Königsberg
1808 births
1875 deaths
Scientists from Königsberg